Chestnut Grove, Virginia may refer to:

Chestnut Grove, Albemarle County, Virginia
Chestnut Grove, Buckingham County, Virginia
Chestnut Grove, Lancaster County, Virginia
Chestnut Grove, Pittsylvania County, Virginia, renamed Whitmell, Virginia